Passiflora jorullensis is a species in the family Passifloraceae.

jorullensis